Giovanni III Visconti (unknown date at Milan - 9 March 1453 at Milan) was the Italian Catholic Archbishop of Milan.

Biography

Origins and the disputed archbishopric 
A member of the prestigious Visconti family, Giovanni III was directly related to other important bishops of Milan such as Giovanni and Ottone Visconti, his namesake and predecessors. Son of the general Vercellino Secondo Visconti of the Visconti di Somma and Giovanna Visconti, Giovanni was archpriest of the Metropolitan Chapter in 1402 and was first appointed archbishop of Milan in the years 1409-1417 by Pope Gregory XII during the Western Schism. The Council of Constance (1414-18) revoked this appointment. From that moment, other than his office as the commendatory abbot of Morimondo Abbey, he disappeared from the active religious scene until 1450.

Archbishop of Milan (1450-1453) 
In early 1450, after the brief interlude of the Ambrosian Republic, Francesco Sforza, son-in-law of the late Duke Filippo Maria Visconti, conquered Milan. While attending the Jubilee of August 3, 1450, the previous Archbishop of Milan, had died. Sforza secured Visconti's appointment from Pope Nicholas V to the Archbishop of Milan. During his brief tenure, Visconti reorganized Milan Cathedral's Chapter, including a fourth canon in the figure of the Provost.

Visconti especially promoted the work of the San Barnaba in Brolo Hospital, founded in 1145, which was the direct predecessor of the Ospedale Maggiore (Maggiore Hospital) in Milan. Because of a common agreement with Duke Sforza and a Papal bull of Niccolò V, Visconti assigned an annual sum of 810 gold ducats to be shared among the staff working there. Giovanni III Visconti died in Milan on March 9, 1453, and was buried in the cathedral.

Coat-of-arms

References

Bibliography

External links 

1453 deaths
Archbishops of Milan
House of Visconti
15th-century Italian Roman Catholic archbishops
Year of birth missing